San Diego Flash was an American soccer team based in San Diego, California, United States. Founded in 1998, the team returned to competitive play in 2011 and most recently played in the Southern Conference of the West Division of the National Premier Soccer League (NPSL), the fourth tier of the American Soccer Pyramid. For the 2001 season the team was known as San Diego F.C..

The team originally spent four years playing in the A-League, but spent almost a decade away from competitive soccer following its withdrawal from that league in 2001. Spearheaded by the efforts of former English Premier League footballer Warren Barton with former Flash player, Jerome Watson as assistant coach, general manager Travis Chesney and former US national team striker Eric Wynalda, the team returned to the field as an exhibition team in 2010 leading to its return to competitive league play in 2011. The Flash dissolved before the 2018 NPSL season, dissolving with the passing of the team owner.

History

A-League Flash (1998–2001)
The original Flash played in the A-League between 1998 and 2001, having acquired the franchise from the defunct Colorado Foxes. The club's founders were president Yan Skwara and Vice-president/general manager Sam Kaloustian, and during the A-league years its head coaches included Ralf Wilhelms, Costa Skouras, Papo Santos, and Colin Clarke.

The club averaged approximately 2,500 fans per game when playing its home games at Southwest College and San Diego Mesa College. The largest crowd for a Flash match was 6,500 at Mesa College for a US Open Cup match against Major League Soccer's Los Angeles Galaxy in 2000.  In 2001, the La Jolla Nomads took over operation of the team and renamed it San Diego FC.

The Flash were fairly successful during their short stint in the league, winning the Pacific Division in 1998 and 1999, finishing second in 2000 and 2001, progressing to the quarter finals of the A-League playoffs in 2001, and reaching the third round of the US Open Cup on two separate occasions. After the 2001 season the team folded due to management and financial problems.

Rebirth and the NPSL (2010–2015)

The club was resurrected in 2010 by a new ownership group, the San Diego Soccer Partners, Inc., which is headed by former Flash part owner Clenton A. Alexander, former English Premier League footballer and Fox Soccer Channel analyst Warren Barton, and former US national team striker Eric Wynalda.

The team resumed exhibition play in 2010 with the goal of returning to league play in 2011 in a league below Major League Soccer with Barton as head coach. In November 2010, during their final exhibition season game, the club announced that they would be returning to competitive league play in 2011 in the National Premier Soccer League, and that the team was being sponsored by Umbro. In January 2011 it was revealed that the team would be playing in the revived Southwest Division of the NPSL and the team would be playing their home games at the football/soccer stadium on the campus of Westview High School on the north side of San Diego. The move from their exhibition location in downtown San Diego was the decision of Flash Soccer CEO; Clent Alexander, for the team to play in a more modern facility.

2011 season
The Flash had a successful first season in the National Premier Soccer League going 12–1–1 on the field (10–3–1 officially due to two forced forfeits on technicalities). Their record was good enough to place first in the NPSL Southwest Division and home field for the first round of the 2011 playoffs. The Flash however were unable to defeat the defending NPSL champion Sacramento Gold in the first round of the playoffs losing 2–1.

2012 season
The 2012 season did start on a somewhat sour note for the Flash having been eliminated from the US Open Cup by their crosstown rival San Diego Boca FC. However, the Flash's second campaign in the NPSL ended up proving just as successful as the first with the team going 11–2–1 with a 13-game unbeaten streak, including having gone unbeaten at home, that was not ended until the last game of the season. For their second NPSL year the team moved from Westview High School to the stadium at Del Norte High School near Poway. The Flash developed several players over the course of the season who earned trials with the San Jose Earthquakes of Major League Soccer. Near the end of the season the team itself enjoyed its two largest home crowds to that point and also began exploring the possibility of moving to the Division 2 North American Soccer League with Alexander presenting a letter to and meeting with the NASL. The team did suffer from a second consecutive early exit from the playoffs in the divisional semi-final losing to the Sonoma County Sol on penalty kicks 5–3 after the game ending in a 2–2 draw.

2013 season
2013 began for the Flash with the departure of coach Warren Barton and his replacement by Jerome Watson.

Players

2012 NPSL Roster
As of July 18, 2012

Notable former players
  Joe Cannon
  Jimmy Conrad
  Ryan Guy
  Mugurel Dumitru
  Thiago Martins
  Jorge Medina
  Geoff Huber

Year-by-year

Honors
 NPSL West Division-Southern Champions – (3) 2011, 2012, 2015
 USL A-League Pacific Division Champions – 1999
 USISL A-League Pacific Division Champions – 1998

Head coaches
  Colin Clarke (2000)
  Costa Skouras
  Papo Santos
  Ralf Wilhelms
  Warren Barton (2010–2012)
  Jerome Watson (2013)

Stadiums
 Stadium at Southwestern College; Chula Vista, California (1998–2000)
 Stadium at San Diego Mesa College; San Diego, California (2001)
 Balboa Stadium; San Diego, California (2010)
 Stadium at Westview High School; San Diego, California (2011)
 Stadium at Del Norte High School; San Diego, California (2012–2013)
 Stadium at Mira Mesa High School; San Diego, California (2014–present)

Rivalries

San Diego Derby
The San Diego Derby is an annual contest that developed between the San Diego Flash and their crosstown rivals San Diego Boca FC. The derby was first contested between the two teams on the Flash's entry into the National Premier Soccer League in 2011. The rivalry however has its roots in the management of the A-League edition of the San Diego Flash that ceased play in 2001 with both the Flash ownership and the SD Boca ownership group having come from fractious portions of the A-League Flash's ownership. The Derby ended with the folding of the Boca franchise after the 2013 season.

References

External links
 Official site
 A-League archives including match reports and standings from 2000 and 2001 seasons

Flash
A-League (1995–2004) teams
1998 establishments in California
Soccer clubs in California
National Premier Soccer League teams
Association football clubs established in 1998
2016 disestablishments in California
Association football clubs disestablished in 2016